FAF may refer to:

People 
 Faf de Klerk (born 1991), South African rugby union footballer
 Faf du Plessis (born 1984), South African cricketer
 Faf Larage (born 1971), French rapper

Sport 
 Algerian Football Federation
 Andalusia Football Federation
 Andorran Football Federation
 Angolan Football Federation
 Aragon Football Federation
 Federación Argentina de Football, the Argentine Football Federation, active 1912–1914

Other uses 
 Citroën FAF, an automobile
 Fagani language, spoken in the Solomon Islands
 Familial Amyloidosis, Finnish Type, a heritable cutaneous condition 
 Fat and Frantic, a British pop group
 Fermata Arts Foundation, an American cultural organization
 Financial Accounting Foundation, an American regulator
 Final approach fix in aviation
 Finnish Air Force
 Fire-and-forget
 First American Financial Corporation, an American financial services company
 French Air and Space Force
 Front Algérie Française, an extremist group in former French Algeria
 Folded arm figurines, an idiosyncratic type of sculpture in Cycladic art
 Fundus autofluorescence, an imaging technique for studying the retina